Cheesman Dam is a  masonry curved gravity dam on the South Platte River located in Colorado. It was the tallest of its type in the world when completed in 1905. The primary purpose of the dam is water supply and it was named for Colorado businessman, Walter Scott Cheesman. In 1973 it was designated a Historic Civil Engineering Landmark. The Denver Water Board purchased the reservoir and related facilities in 1918.

External links
 Cheesman Dam at Denver Water

Bibliography

 

Dams in Colorado
Dams in the Mississippi River basin
Dams completed in 1905
Historic Civil Engineering Landmarks
Buildings and structures in Douglas County, Colorado
Masonry dams
1905 establishments in Colorado